The history of education in Africa can be roughly divided into pre- and post- colonial periods. Since the introduction of formal education to Africa by European colonists, African education, particularly in West and Central Africa, is characterised by both traditional African teachings and European-style schooling systems. The state of education reflects not only the effects of colonialism, but instability resulting from and exacerbated by armed conflicts in many regions of Africa as well as fallout from humanitarian crises such as famine, lack of drinking water, and outbreaks of diseases such as malaria and Ebola, among others.  Although the quality of education and the quantity of well-equipped schools and teachers has steadily increased since the onset of the colonial period, there are still evident numerous inequalities in the existing educational systems based on region, economic status, and gender.

List of African countries by level of literacy 
This entry includes a definition of literacy and UNESCO's percentage estimates for populations aged 15 years and over, including total population, males, and females.

History

Education in Precolonial Africa 
Precolonial Africa was made up of ethnic groups and states that embarked on migrations depending on seasons, availability of fertile soil, and political circumstances. Therefore, power was decentralized among several states in precolonial Africa ( many people held some form of authority as such power was not concentrated in a particular person or an institution). Usually, a person's entitlement to land (which were mostly given patriarchally) gives the person some form of power within the person's household and or within the person's ethnic group. Households were also economically independent such that members of a household produced their own food, shelter and security. There was, therefore, no need for a formally organized education in certain pre-colonial African states, as members of each household learned their skills, values, responsibilities, socialization and norms of their community or household by observing and assisting older household members or community members. State-organized formal schools existed among Sahelian kingdoms in West Africa.

Education in many precolonial African states was in the form of apprenticeship, which was a form of informal education, where children and or younger members of each household mostly learned from older members of their household, and community. In most cases, each household member learned more than one skills in addition to learning the values, socialization, and norms of the community/tribe/household. Some of the common skills that people in precolonial Africa had to learn include, dancing, farming, wine making, cooking (mostly the females), and in some cases selected people learn how to practice herbal medicine, how to carve stools, how to carve masks and other furniture.

Story telling also played a significant role in education during pre-colonial Africa. Parents, other older members of households and Griots used oral story telling to teach children about the history, norms and values of their state, household and community. Children usually gathered around the storyteller who then narrates stories, usually, using personifications to tell stories that encourage conformity, obedience and values such as endurance, integrity, and other ethical values that are important for co-operations in the community.

Festivals and rituals in most cases were also used as means to teach younger members of a household or community about the history of their region or state. Rituals were mainly used to teach young adults about the responsibilities and expectations of adulthood such as teaching females how to cook and care for a household and teaching the men how to hunt, farm, make masks, etc. An example of a ritual which was used to teach young girls about womanhood is Dipo. This ritual was used to teach young girls, usually, adolescents about cooking, motherhood, and other necessary womanhood skills and values before they marry (engage in sexually related activities).

The origins of African education may be found in Egypt in Northern Africa.  One of the first convenient mediums for retaining accurate information, papyrus, was used to develop systems for learning and developing new ideas. In fact, one of the first forms of higher education in Africa were the School of Holy Scriptures built in Ethiopia and Al-Azhar which was in Egypt. These schools became cultural and academic centers as many people traveled from all over the globe for knowledge and instruction. Well before contact with external cultures, Africans had developed pools of understanding and educational tools.

Overview of Education in Colonial Africa 

The onset of the colonial period in the 19th century marked the beginning of the end for traditional African education as the primary method of instruction. European military forces, missionaries, and colonists all came ready and willing to change existing traditions to meet their own needs and ambitions. Colonial powers such as Spain, Portugal, Belgium and France colonized the continent without putting in a system of education. Because the primary focus of colonization was reaping benefits from commercial colonial economies, cash crop production, extraction of raw materials, other physically laborious tasks were prioritized. These economies did not expand to require jobs of a higher skill set or more labor, therefore intensive labor that required little skill was high in demand. Because of such circumstances, there was little demand to educate or train the colonized populations. Furthermore, colonial powers were unwilling to offer education to those they colonized unless it benefited them. Either colonial powers did not view investing in African education as a practical use of their revenue or they refrained from educating Africans in order to avoid any uprisings. Those in positions of authority were in fear of access to widespread access to higher education specifically. Colonial powers often found themselves in a debate whether or not to educate their colonized populations and if so, to what extent. Specifically, the British Education Committee of the Privy Council advocated for vocational education and training rather than one focused on academia. This vocational training however neglected professions such as engineering, technology, or similar subjects. Instead, the vocational training had a dominant racial overtone that stressed African training for skills fitting with their assumed social and mental inadequacy. Notably, the Belgians under Leopold II prohibited access to higher education in their colonies, whilst other colonial powers put in barriers in infrastructure or access such as limiting language of instruction to the language of the colonizer, limits on teaching curriculums, and ensuring the curriculum did not reflect any Afro-ethnicity. By demanding that communities create physical schools with strict curriculum, the foreign powers were able to dictate what the people learned, adjusting it to further their agenda. This not only forced new form and content to education, but abandoned the knowledge gained from the largely informal education.  With less community awareness, efficiency in learning skills, and especially understanding of the past, African communities began to dwindle in education and prosperity. Aspects of colonialism and its tumultuous effects on the ethos of education are still prevalent in African countries that still struggle to escape the effects of colonization today.

However, a 2021 study found that colonial education systems may also have had some positive effects on education levels in Africa, namely on numeracy. The increase of numeracy in Africa had been accelerating since the 1830s, but it picked up speed during the late 19th and the first two decades of the 20th century. This suggests that colonial education was a determining factor for better education. This positive relationship might have existed due to the effort to spread European schooling among native populations to legitimize colonial power, since this accelerated the organization of schools. At the same time, demand for European-prompted education was rising because the colonial economy brought about new export opportunities, which African farmers responded to.  

Between the 1950s and 1990s, African countries finally regained their independence. With this recovered freedom, they began to rebuild their traditional forms of education.  What had inevitably evolved, however, was a hybrid of the two models. With the collaboration of donor agencies and Western demand, pushes for development of African education and the building of human capital dominated global conversation. Namely, the 1960s were known as the First Development Decade by the UN. Policymakers prioritized secondary and tertiary education before also setting their sights for universal primary education around 1980. This set the precedent for educational planning. Although children and adults may learn from their families and community, a sense of individuality has also developed that today both drives ingenuity and creates separation between groups and cultural tradition.  African education programs have developed that involve both groups; an HIV/AIDS awareness program, for example, may involve members coming into communities and sharing their knowledge.  Although this is a direct, cognitive approach, they also try to involve all members of the community, allowing for the creation of ownership and cultural acceptance.

French Colonial Africa 

The use of education as a tool of colonization was widespread throughout the French Colonial Empire. Hubert Lyautey, the first Resident-General of French Morocco, advocated for the facilitation of ruling and conquest through cooperation with native elites. To facilitate the relationship with this "bourgeois" class of francophone Africans, selective educational institutions were established across the French Empire.

The teaching of the French language in Moroccan institutions of higher education, such as the University of Fez, was intended to "promote economic development and political compliance without assimilating or deracinating the students or preparing them for political agency". This system allowed colonial authorities to educate a class of native Moroccans that could carry out administrative roles and functions. In his book, French Colonial Education and the Making of the Francophone African Bourgeoisie, Program Chair of Africana Studies at Washington and Lee University, Mohamed Kamara writes, "For the kind of society the colonialist had in mind, he must create and nurture an elite that will assist for as long as possible in the administration and exploitation of its vast overseas territories".

In classrooms, students were given a predetermined curriculum. The basic goal of this classroom practice was to provide only a limited selection of information for students, leaving very little margin for questioning or critical thinking. Only a limited number of families were permitted to send their children to school, which fit with the underlying goal of creating an exclusive class of native-born Moroccans, who would serve as a sort of liaison between white colonial officials and the masses.

British Colonial Africa 

Education in British Colonial Africa can be characterized by three primary phases. The first of these is from the end of the 19th century until the outbreak of the First World War, then the Interwar Period, and finally, the conclusion of the Second World War until independence.

From the late 19th-Century until the First World War, British colonial education in Africa was largely carried out by missionaries at mission schools. Although these schools were founded with religious intent, they played a significant role in the early colonial machine. Much like in French Colonial Africa, British colonists sought out English-speaking natives who could serve as 'liaisons" between them and the native population, however, this was done far more out of an economic incentive than a political one. As the demand for English-speaking Africans increased, mission schools provided training in the form of teaching of the Bible. As time went on, however, British industrialists began to complain about the lack of skilled labor, and as such, the British Government supplied mission schools with grants for the vocational training of Africans in various trades critical to British industrial efforts.

British colonial education in Africa during the Interwar Period can be characterized by a push for uniformity, despite colonial authorities demonstrating their acute awareness of the notable differences between the different regions of the Empire. Critical to this, as well, was the universal recognition of nationality as a basic human right under the Covenant of the League of Nations. Colonies were, as outlined by the League of Nations, to be eventually granted independence, with the European powers entrusted as the stewards of "civilization" for their respective colonies. Colonies were only to be allowed independence once they could demonstrate their capacity for self-rule. In former Governor General of Nigeria (1914–1919), Lord Lugard's, 1922 book, The Dual Mandate in British Tropical Africa writes,

"...do not enter the tropics on sufferance, or employ their technical skill, their energy, and their capital as 'interlopers' or as 'greedy capitalists', but in the fulfillment of the Mandate of civilization".

In accordance with this, in 1923 the British Government established the Advisory Committee on Education in British Tropical Africa (with the word 'tropical' removed to broaden its jurisdiction). With its establishment, for the first time, the colonial authority would be uniformly administering its educational goals across all British African colonies. Programs begun under the new committee were aimed at increasing the "self-sufficiency" of village economies and providing community incentives to counteract flight into big cities. Educational practices under the CEBA came to be known as 'adapted', as it was sought to adjust western education to the contemporary European understanding of the 'African Mind' as inherently different; education was often administered through local contexts and practices, all the while teaching western curriculum. In his essay British Colonial Education in Africa: Policy and Practice in the Era of Trusteeship, Aaron Windel of Bowdoin College describes it as such,

"Typical lessons in a village school operating on adapted principles focused on hygiene, vernacular word building, drill, and basic local geography. Ideally, lessons would be taught on the principle of 'teach by doing' and would include objects from village life. One geography lesson used a bicycle pump, a pail of water, and a small gourd to simulate a ship carrying sugar from India and caught in a monsoon. Adapted pedagogy could also include dramatizations of 'African tribal histories' or special holiday plays with an African focus".

Most British officials (including Lord Lugard) believed that trusteeship would continue for many generations to come, and the goals of 'civilizing' the native population began to take precedence. Treatment of colonial subjects continued to vary wildly as determined by race, and white settlers were continuously given preferential treatment in the distribution of land and opportunities for careers, among other benefits.

The British education system proved to be quite effective. A 2021 study observed a positive effect of British colonization on education levels. Areas that were influenced by the British education system showed a rapid increase in numeracy. For example, in South Africa – where the colonial education and political system switched from Dutch to British in 1806 – the increase in numeracy was rapid since the early-19th century. The reliance on local resources and languages in education as well as missionary largely being run by Africans seem to have had a positive impact.

As British-administered schools were taking shape during the Interwar Period, a number of independent schools focusing on literacy and offering alternative curricula began to emerge. Such schools were thought of as a threat to the colonial system and colonial governments were worried that these so-called 'outlaw' schools would instill thoughts of subversion and anti-colonialism in the native populations. One such independent school was formed in Kenya among the Kikuyu, and made English as its language of instruction, with the ultimate goal of enabling the Kikuyu to fight for land property rights in colonial legal and administrative bodies. Over time, as anti-colonial sentiment gained momentum, independent schools were increasingly viewed by the colonial government as breeding grounds for freedom fighters and independence advocates, which culminated in their banning in 1952 as part of the Mau Mau Emergency.

Education in postcolonial Africa 

In 2000, the United Nations adopted the Millennium Development Goals, a set of development goals for the year 2015, more specifically, "to ensure that by 2015, children everywhere, boys and girls alike will be able to complete a full course of primary schooling." That same year, the World Education Forum met in Dakar, Senegal, and adopted the Dakar Framework for Action reaffirming the commitment to achieving Education for All by the year 2015.

At the time, according to UNESCO, only 57% of African children were enrolled in primary schools, the lowest enrollment rate of any region surveyed. The report also showed marked gender inequalities: in almost all countries enrollment of boys far outpaced that of girls. However, in some countries, education is relatively strong. In Zimbabwe, literacy has reached 92%.

Steps such as the abolition of school fees, investments in teaching infrastructure and resources, and school meals from the World Food Programme helped drive enrollment up by millions. Yet despite the significant progress of many countries, the world fell short of meeting its goal of Universal Primary Education (UPE). In sub-Saharan Africa as of 2013, only about 79% of primary school-age children were enrolled in school. 59 million children of primary-school age were out of school, and enrollment of girls continued to lag behind that of boys. Disparity between genders is partially due to females being excluded from school for being pregnant.

Following the expiration of the MDGs in 2015, the UN adopted a set of Sustainable Development Goals for the year 2030. The fourth goal addressed education, with the stated aim to "ensure inclusive and equitable quality education and promote lifelong learning opportunities for all." The World Education Forum also convened in Incheon, Korea to discuss the implementation of this goal, and adopted the Incheon Declaration for Education 2030. Data reflecting the effects the latest measures have on the state of education participation in African countries is not readily available. There are many underlying causes that deter progress towards education equity, such as high attrition rates of students, teacher shortages, poor infrastructure and supplies, access to education for rural and remote areas, and stigmas surrounding marginalized groups, among many others.

Language

Due to high linguistic diversity, the legacy of colonialism, and the need for knowledge of international languages such as English and French in employment and higher education, most schooling in Africa takes places in languages that teachers and pupils do not speak natively, and in some cases simply do not understand. There is considerable evidence that pupils schooled in a second language achieve poorer results than those schooled in their mother tongue, as lack of proficiency in the second language impairs understanding and encourages ineffective rote learning. Although UNESCO have recommended since the 1950s that children be taught early literacy in their mother tongue, progressing later to other languages, not all African countries implement this effectively. Even where the earliest grades are taught in the mother tongue, pupils are typically forced to switch to languages such as English and French before acquiring proficiency in these languages.

Lack of proper facilities and educators

Another reason for the low education rates in Africa is the lack of proper schooling facilities and unequal opportunities for education across countries.  Many schools across Africa find it hard to employ teachers due to the low pay and lack of suitable people. This is particularly true for schools in remote areas. Most people who manage to receive education would prefer to move to big cities or even overseas where more opportunities and higher pay await. Thus, there will be an overly large class sizes and a high average number of students per teacher in a school. Moreover, the teachers are usually those unqualified with few teaching aids and/or textbook provision. Due to this, children attending schools in rural areas usually attain poorer results in standardised tests compared to their urban counterparts. This can be seen in the reports given by the Northern and Eastern Africa Consortium for Monitoring Educational Quality (SACMEQ). Those taking the tests in rural areas score much lower than those in small towns and big cities. This shows a lack of equal education opportunity given to children from different parts of the same country.

With teachers being less qualified than others in urban areas the teaching to learning environment takes an effect amongst the students. In one instance teachers took the same test as their students and three-fourths of them had failed. In addition, those that do not receive the same education to those in the bigger cities have trouble even after graduation with reading, writing, and doing math. Students who do not attain the same equal education to those in urban environments do not achieve the same outcome in establishing success with a career. With education being a major concern towards achieving a career and establishing a future, Africa needs to be aware that equal education needs to be established within all schools throughout the countries.

Emigration

Emigration has led to a loss of highly educated people and financial loss. The loss of skilled people can only be replaced with another huge cost which imply the loss of money spent educating people who leave and new people to replace them. Even though an almost 5.5% of GDP investment in education, the loss makes it difficult for the government to budget another amount in education as they will need to prioritize other needs such as military budget and debt servicing.

Culture 

Western models and standards still continue to dominate African education. Because of colonization African institutions, particularly universities, still instruct using Euro-centric curriculums with almost no connection to life in Africa. This is further perpetuated by the use of European and American imported textbooks. Many view this lack of self sufficiency as an ongoing effect of colonization upheld by the modern, corrupt African elite. This attitude rests on the basis that during colonization the African ruling elite exploited their own people for their own benefit rather than advocate for the interests of their own people.

Global Water Crisis 

The global water crisis has severe effects on education in rural countries in Africa. Limited access to education and health issues can be further compounded by inadequate water systems or disease that may follow. Malaria, cited to be a main cause of death in Africa, is a mosquito-borne disease that can commonly be found in unmanaged pools of still water. The mosquitos breed in such pools and consequently, children who drink from these pools can die or fall severely ill. Furthermore, such an intense illness can later affect the cognitive abilities of children who fall ill at a young age. This is not only applicable biologically but also as an effect of falling ill: children who miss a significant amount of school are unable to optimize their education due to missing lessons.

Military and Conflict

Military spending is causing education spending to decrease immensely. According to a March 2011 report by UNESCO, armed conflict is the biggest threat to education in Africa. While the number of dropouts across the continent has been increasing dramatically, one of the influences of war and conflict on education is the diversion of public funds from education to military spending. An already underfunded system is losing more money. Twenty-one African countries have been identified as the highest spenders of gross domestic product on military globally compared with the amount directed toward education. Military and conflict also leads to the displacement of children. It often forces them to remain in camps or flee to their neighboring countries where education is not available the world is going to explode to them.

Influential initiatives 
Initiatives to improve education in Africa include:

Intracontinental

NEPAD's E-school programme is an ambitious plan to provide internet and computer facilities to all schools on the continent.
SACMEQ is a consortium of 15 Ministries of Education in Southern and Eastern Africa that undertakes integrated research and training activities to monitor and evaluate the quality of basic education, and generates information that can be used by decision-makers to plan and improve the quality of education.
 For 10 years, the Benin Education Fund (BEF) has provided scholarships and education support to students from the Atakora province in northeastern Benin. Over 450 students have been able to stay in school because of their programmes.

International

She's the First is a New York City, New York-based non-profit organization. The organization seeks to empower girls in Asia, Africa, and Latin America by facilitating the sponsorship of their education through creative and innovative means.
 Working through local organizations, The African Children's Educational Trust is supporting thousands of youngsters with long-term scholarships and a community rural elementary school building programme. It has built seven schools to date and is raising funds for more.
British Airways' "" project which, in collaboration with UNICEF, opened the model school Kuje Science Primary School in Nigeria in 2002.
 The Elias Fund provides scholarships to children in Zimbabwe to get a better education.
 The Ahmadiyya Muslim Community in association with Humanity First, an international charity organisation, has built over 500 schools in the African continent and is running a 'learn a skill' initiative for young men and women.
Fast Track Initiative
The Volkswagen Foundation has been running a funding initiative called "Knowledge for Tomorrow – Cooperative Research Projects in Sub-Saharan Africa" since 2003. It provides scholarships for young African researchers and helps to establish a scientific community in African universities.
The McGovern-Dole International Food for Education and Child Nutrition Program is a foreign assistance program in which the United States donates agricultural commodities and money to support school feeding programs in foreign countries, many of which are in Africa.

Corruption in education 

A 2010 Transparency International report, with research gathered from 8,500 educators and parents in Ghana, Madagascar, Morocco, Niger, Senegal, Sierra Leone and Uganda, found that education is being denied to African children in incredibly large numbers.

A lack of parent involvement, especially as an overseer of government activities also leads to enormous corruption. This was most often found to be because parents and communities feel as though they lack any kind of power in regard to their child's education. In Uganda only 50% of parents believe that they have the power to influence decisions regarding the education of their child. In Morocco, just 20% of parents believed they held any sort of power.

The unavailability and incompleteness of records in schools and districts prevents the documentation and prevention of corrupt practices. The African Education Watch conducted surveys all over the continent and identified the three most common practices of corruption:

Illegal collection of fees: One part of their research focused on so-called registration fees. Parents from every country surveyed reported paying even though, by law, primary schooling is free. The report found that the number of parents forced to pay these illegal accounting fees ranged from 9% in Ghana, to 90% in Morocco. An average of 44% of parents still report paying skill fees in the study. The average fee cost $4.16, a major expense for families in countries like Madagascar, Niger and Sierra Leone.
Embezzlement of school funds: In the study, Transparency International found that 64% of the schools surveyed on the continent published no financial information at all.
Power abuse: Another major problem is incompetent management. The report found that in many schools the little resources they did have were being wasted or lost. Overall, 85% of schools across all countries had either deficient accounting systems or none at all. In Morocco, just 23% of head teachers received training in financial management, despite being responsible for budgets. The TI report found that there was sexual abuse in schools from teachers. The TI report also found that many schools were plagued by teacher absenteeism and alcoholism.

Without this basic education, the report found it was nearly impossible to go on to high school or college. African children are missing this link that allows them to have a chance in trade or to go beyond their villages.

Involvement of non-governmental organizations

A report by USAID and the Bureau for Africa, Office of Sustainable Development, found that non-governmental organizations (NGOs) are increasingly participating in contribute to the delivery of education services, education policy decisions and are included by donors and government officials in many parts of the education system. Of course, this varies from country to country and region to region.

NGOs working in education in Africa often encountered tension and competition when working. Schools, parents and, most often government officials, feel threatened by third-party involvement and feel that they are "crashing the party." The report continues that for NGOs to be effective, they must understand that they do not have the same perspective as government officials as to who is in control. If they do not recognize the government of the country they are working in, they will compromise their objectives.

The report goes into more detail about NGO relations with governments in education. The relationship is viewed from completely separate points. African governments see NGOs and their work as "an affair of government" or, in other words, working as a part and in collaboration with the country's government. NGOs on the other hand view themselves as very separate entities in African education. They see themselves fulfilling moral responsibility. They believe that they are identifying needs or areas of development in situations under which the government has ultimately been unaccountable and separately mobilizing resources toward those needs or development areas. Government and NGOs may hold contrasting beliefs about each other's abilities. Governments often think NGOs are unqualified to make important policy decisions and that they could undermine their legitimacy if seen as superior. In some cases, NGOs have found government incompetent themselves, if not their own fault, as the fault of a lack of resources. In the best cases, NGOs and government officials find each other's mutual strengths in education policy and find ways to practically collaborate and reach both of their objectives.

To be effective in education in Africa NGOs must effect policy and create policy changes that support their projects. NGOs also found that to see this policy change that they are striving for, they must create and foster relationships with many different stakeholders. The most important stakeholders are usually donors and government officials. The biggest challenge for NGOs has been linking these networks together. NGO interventions to change policy have revealed that NGO programmes have failed to create a successful way to change the policy process while making sure that the public understands and is a part of education policy. This problem will prove more influential in the future if it is not solved.

Adult education

Adult education in Africa, having experienced a comeback following the independence and increasing prosperity of many African nations, poses specific requirements on policymakers and planners to take into consideration indigenous cultural traits and characteristics. With a moderate backlash against Western ideals and educational traditions, many universities and other institutes of higher education take it upon themselves to develop a new approach to higher education and adult education.

Most contemporary analysts regard illiteracy as a development issue because of the link between poverty and illiteracy. Funding is inadequate and inconsistent and is needed for priority areas such as educator training, monitoring, and evaluation. There is a clear need for investment in capacity development, having a full, sufficiently paid and well qualified professionalized staff, and increasing the demands for adult education professionals. The majority of adult educators are untrained, especially in basic literacy. Governments often employ school teachers and others in adult education posts rather than experienced adult educators.  Many of the difficulties experienced could be solved by an allocation of resources to meet the needs (adequate funds, more staff, appropriate training for staff and suitable material). Underfunding is a huge threat to the sustainability of these programs, and in some cases, to their continued existence. The best-reported data on funding is about adult literacy and non-formal education programs. Funding for continuing education, either academic or vocational is provided and reported on, but little data is given on its financing. Funding may come from public or private sector sources. International and foreign aid is also likely to be important. The costs of much adult education seem to be kept artificially low by the use of state facilities and by the extremely low salaries paid to many adult education specialists.

Public universities have not been successful in attracting older students onto mainstream degree programs and so the post-apartheid ideal of opening access to public higher education for growing numbers of non-traditional students is not yet a reality. However, certain countries have reported some success rates in Adult Education programs.  Between 1990 and 2007 Uganda enrolled over 2million participants in the functional adult literacy program. The Family Basic Education program was active in 18 schools by 2005, reaching over 3,300 children and 1,400 parents. This is a successful family literacy mediation whose impact at household, school and community level has been evaluated.

Unfortunately, the national reports typically do not provide sufficient information on the content of the adult education programs that run in their countries. In the majority of cases, the name of the program is as much detail as is given. Curriculum content does not seem to be a major issue.

Cultural Considerations

African communities are very close knit; activities, lifestyles, particularities of individuals are nearly always common knowledge.  Because of this, it is difficult for any one member or group within an area to take a significantly different approach to any facet of life within the community.  For this reason, program planners for adult learners in Africa find higher rates of success when they employ a participatory approach.  Through open and honest dialogue about the fears, motivations, beliefs and ambitions of the community as a whole, there is less social strain concerning individual divergent behavior.

In addition to strong traditional beliefs, years of slavery through colonization have led to a sense of unity and common struggle in African communities.  Therefore, lesson plans in these areas should reflect this cultural sensibility; collaboration and cooperation are key components of successful programs.  Teaching techniques that utilize these ideas may include story-telling, experiential simulation, and the practice of indigenous traditions with slight modifications.  Every program and lesson must be tailored to the particular community because they almost always learn, live, and achieve as a group or not at all.

Informal education plays a strong role within indigenous learning in African communities.  This poses a significant challenge to western-style program planners that emphasize formal learning within a designated time-frame and setting.  These requirements must often be abandoned in order to achieve success in communities that have no strong affinity for time and formal education.  Programs must be planned that become ingrained into the daily life of participants, that reflects their values and add positive functionality to their lives.  Successful programs often involve more long-term learning arrangements consisting of regular visits and the free, unforced exchange of information.

Philosophies

African philosophy of adult education recognizes the western ideas such as liberalism, progressivism, humanism and behaviorism, while complementing them with native African perspectives.

Ethnophilosophy is the idea that the main purpose of adult education is to enable social harmony at all levels of society, from immediate family to community and country.  It is of primary importance to ensure the retention of knowledge passed down from one generation to another concerning values, cultural understanding and beliefs.  This philosophy promotes active learning – learning by doing, following, practicing the work of the elders.  Particular lessons may be taught through activities such as role-play, practical demonstrations, exhibitions, discussions or competitions.
The nationalist-ideological philosophy separates itself from ethnophilosophy in that it less concerned with the methods of learning and more with its use.  As a philosophy born of the revolutionary movements of the 1950s, it is unsurprising that its main focus is to be able to apply knowledge to active participation in politics and civil society.  Although it is important in this philosophy to retain the communal nature of traditional African society, functionalism for social understanding and change takes prime importance in its implementation.
Professional philosophy represents the strongest bridge between western and traditional African educational systems.  It promotes a hybrid approach to adult programs, allowing for a wide range of learning techniques, even purely cognitive lecture, so long as community values are accounted for within the lesson.  Finally, philosophic sagacity suggests that the only true African philosophies are those that have developed with no contact with the West whatsoever.  Rather than a specific approach, this idea simply notes the huge range of educational techniques that may exist throughout the continent by a wide variety of people.  It essentially states that there is no one correct method, and that the subject and activities should always be set by the participants.

Women's education 

In 2000, 93.4 million women in Sub-Saharan Africa were illiterate. Many reasons exist for why formal education for females is unavailable to so many, including cultural reasons. For example, some believe that a woman's education will get in the way of her duties as a wife and a mother. In some places in Africa where women marry at age 12 or 13, education is considered a hindrance to a young woman's development.

A positive correlation exists between the enrollment of girls in primary school and the gross national product and increase of life expectancy. However, women's education in Africa has sometimes been dotted with instances of sexual violence. Sexual violence against girls and female students affects many African education systems. In Sub-Saharan Africa, sexual violence is one of the most common and least known forms of corruption.

Disparity in Education 

While most of the Millennium Development Goals face a deadline of 2015, the gender parity target was set to be achieved a full ten years earlier – an acknowledgment that equal access to education is the foundation for all other development goals. Gender disparity is defined as inequalities of some quantity attributed to the reason of gender type. In countries where resources and school facilities are lacking, and total enrollments are low, a choice must often be made in families between sending a girl or a boy to school. Of an estimated 101 million children not in school, more than half are girls. However, this statistic increased when examining secondary school education. In high-income countries, 95% as many girls as boys attend primary and secondary schools. However, in sub-Saharan Africa the figure is just 60%.

The foremost factor limiting female education is poverty. Economic poverty plays a key role when it comes to coping with direct costs such as tuition fees, cost of textbooks, uniforms, transportation and other expenses. Wherever, especially in families with many children, these costs exceed the income of the family, girls are the first to be denied schooling. This gender bias decision in sending females to school is also based on gender roles dictated by culture. Girls usually are required to complete household chores or take care of their younger siblings when they reach home. This limits their time to study and in many cases, may even have to miss school to complete their duties. It is common for girls to be taken out of school at this point. Boys however, may be given more time to study if their parents believe that education will allow them to earn more in the future. Expectations, attitudes and biases in communities and families, economic costs, social traditions, and religious and cultural beliefs limit girls' educational opportunities.

Additionally, in most African societies, women are seen as the collectors, managers, and guardians of water, especially within the domestic sphere that includes household chores, cooking, washing, and child rearing. Because of these traditional gender labor roles, women are forced to spend around sixty percent of each day collecting water, which translates to approximately 200 million collective work hours by women globally per day and a decrease in the amount of time available for education, shown by the correlation of decrease in access to water with a decrease in combined primary, secondary, and tertiary enrollment of women.

Whatever the underlying reason(s) are, about having large numbers of girls outside the formal schooling system brings developmental challenges to both current and future generations. According to the UNESCO, the rates of female children out of primary school is higher than that of male children in all the African countries where data is available. Until equal numbers of girls and boys are in school, it will be impossible to build the knowledge necessary to eradicate poverty and hunger, combat disease and ensure environmental sustainability. Millions of children and women will continue to die needlessly, placing the rest of the development agenda at risk.

Significance of a Gender-Equitable Education System

In Africa and the Arab world, promoting gender equality and empowering women is perhaps the most important of the eight Millennium Development Goals. The target associated with achieving this goal is to eliminate gender disparity in primary and secondary enrollment preferably by 2005, and at all levels by 2015. Women deserve the instrumental effects of gender equality in education and the intrinsic dimension of female education; which in essence derives from the role of education in enhancing a woman's set of capabilities. Thus, in theory, there is a direct effect from female education to income (or growth).
Education, especially for girls, has social and economic benefits for society as a whole. Women earn only one-tenth of the world's income and own less than one percent of property, so households without a male head are at special risk of impoverishment. These women will also be less likely to immunize their children and know how to help them survive. Women who are educated tend to have fewer and healthier children, and these children are more likely to attend school. Higher female education makes women better-informed mothers and hence could
contribute to lowering child mortality rates and malnutrition. In Africa, limited education and employment opportunities for women reduce annual per capita growth by 0.8%. Had this growth taken place, Africa's economies would have doubled over the past 30 years. It is estimated that some low-income countries in Africa would need up to $23.8 billion annually to achieve the Millennium Development Goal focused on promoting gender equality and empowering women by 2015. This would translate from $7 to $13 per capita per year from 2006 to 2015, according to OECD-DAC.
 Education is also key to an effective response to HIV/AIDS. Studies show that educated women are more likely to know how to prevent HIV infection, to delay sexual activity and to take measures to protect themselves. New analysis by the Global Campaign for Education suggests that if all children received a complete primary education, the economic impact of HIV/AIDS could be greatly reduced and around 700,000 cases of HIV in young adults could be prevented each year—seven million in a decade. According to the Global Campaign for Education, "research shows that a primary education is the minimum threshold needed to benefit from health information programmes. Not only is a basic education essential to be able to process and evaluate information, it also gives the most marginalized groups in society—notably young women—the status and confidence needed to act on information and refuse unsafe sex."

Current Policies of Progression 

The Convention on the Elimination of All Forms of Discrimination against Women (CEDAW), adopted in 1979 by the UN General Assembly and acceded to by 180 States, sets down rights for women, of freedom from discrimination and equality under the law. CEDAW has realized the rights and equality of woman is also the key to the survival and development of children and to building healthy families, communities and nations. Article 10 pinpoints nine changes that must be changed in order to help African women and other women suffering from gender disparity. It first states, there must be the same conditions for careers, vocational guidance, and for the achievement of diplomas in educational establishments of all categories in rural as well as in urban areas. This equality shall be ensured in pre-school, general, technical, professional and higher technical education, as well as in all types of vocational training. Second, is access to the same curricula, the same examinations, teaching staff with qualifications of the same standard and school premises and equipment of the same quality. Third, is the elimination of any stereotyped concept of the roles of men and women at all levels and in all forms of education. This is encouraged by coeducation and other types of education which will help to achieve this aim and, in particular, by the revision of textbooks and school programmes and the adaptation of teaching methods. Fourth, the same opportunities to benefit from scholarships and other study grants. Similarly, fifth is the same opportunities of access to programmes of continuing education, including adult and functional literacy programmes, particularly those aimed at reducing, at the earliest possible time, any gap in education existing between men and women. Sixth, is the reduction of female student drop-out rates and the organization of programmes for girls and women who have left school prematurely. Seventh concern listed is the same opportunities to participate actively in sports and physical education. Lastly, is access to specific educational information to help to ensure the health and well-being of families, including information and advice on family planning.

Other global goals echoing these commitments include the World Education Forum's Dakar platform, which stresses the rights of girls, ethnic minorities and children in difficult circumstances; and A World Fit for Children's emphasis on ensuring girls' equal access to and achievement in basic education of good quality. In April 2000 more than 1,100 participants from 164 countries gathered in Dakar, Senegal, for the World Education Forum. Ranging from teachers to prime ministers, academics to policymakers, non-governmental bodies to the heads of major international organizations, they adopted the Dakar Framework for Action, Education for All: Meeting Our Collective Commitments. The goal is education for all as laid out by the World Conference on Education for All and other international conferences. Between 1990 and 1998 the net enrollment of boys increased by 9% to 56%, and of girls by 7% to 48% in sub-Saharan Africa. However, these figures mask considerable regional variations. In countries of the Indian Ocean, both girls and boys attained over 70% net enrollment. The most outstanding progress in terms of percentage increase of boys' enrollment was in East Africa, where the net enrollment of boys increased by 27% (to 60%) and of girls by 18% (to 50%). For girls in Southern Africa, the comparable figures for girls were 23% (to 7%) and for boys, 16% (to 58%). This is the resurgence of a vibrant Africa, rich in its cultural diversity, history, languages and arts, standing united to end its marginalization in world progress and development to create a prosperous Africa, where the knowledge and the skills of its people are its first and most important resource.

The Forum for African Women Educationalists (FAWE) announces a call for the second round of research proposals from research institutions for its Strengthening Gender Research To Improve Girls' And Women's Education In Africa initiative. The initiative, which is supported by the Norwegian Agency for Development Cooperation (NORAD), promotes girls and women's education through the integration of gender into education policy and practice in sub-Saharan Africa. FAWE believes it is vital to invest in research in Africa as a way to produce current information for advocacy in education policy. This three-year research initiative aims to work collaboratively with established research institutions to produce pertinent and robust research, which can be used to constructively engage government, policy makers and other regional bodies on strategies to advance girls' education in Africa. Findings from the research will be used to inform FAWE's advocacy work and help redress gender inequities that hinder women's fulfillment of their right to education and meaningful participation in Africa's social and economic advancement.

Major progress in access to education 

A joint study by the World Bank and AFD carried out by Alain Mingat, Blandine Ledoux and Ramahatra Rakotomalala sought to anticipate the pressures that would be brought to bear on post-primary teaching. The study puts it this way: "In the reference year (2005), our sample of 33 countries in sub-Saharan Africa had 14.9 million pupils enrolled in the first year of secondary school. If the rate of completion of the primary stage reaches 95% by 2020 with levels of transition from primary to the first year of secondary maintained at their current level in each country, the first year of secondary school would have 37.2 million pupils in 2020, or 2.5 times the current number. If all the pupils finishing primary school could continue with their education, the number of pupils in the first year of secondary school would reach 62.9 million by 2020, a multiplication by 4.2 over the period." Behind the regional averages, there are still enormous disparities between the countries, and even between the different zones and regions within countries, which means that it is not possible to "[…] identify conditions that apply uniformly to education across the different countries of sub-Saharan Africa." While some countries have lower demographic growth, others enjoy a more satisfactory level of school enrolment. Only a few countries are falling seriously behind in education at the same time as having to address a steady growth in their school-age population: Niger, Eritrea, Burundi, Guinea-Bissau, Uganda and to a lesser extent Burkina Faso, Chad, Mali, Mozambique, Rwanda, Senegal and Malawi are particularly affected by this dual constraint. The EFA 2012 report highlights great disparities between the sub-Saharan African countries: the percentage of children excluded from primary school is only 7% in Gabon and 14% in Congo compared to over 55% in Burkina Faso and Niger. The gap in terms of the proportion of those excluded from the first year of middle school is even wider, with 6% in Gabon compared to 68% in Burkina Faso and 73% in Niger.

The majority of out-of-school populations are to be found in countries where there is conflict or very weak governance. At the Dakar Forum, the 181 signatory countries of the Dakar Framework for Action identified armed conflict as well as internal instability within a country as "a major barrier towards attaining Education for All" (EFA) – education being one of the sectors to suffer most from the effects of armed conflict and political instability. In the 2011 EFA Global Monitoring Report, UNESCO pointed out that the countries touched by conflict showed a gross rate of secondary school admissions almost 30% lower than countries of equivalent revenue that were at peace. Conflicts also affect the rate of literacy of the population. At the global level, the rate of literacy among adults in countries touched by conflict was 69% in 2010 compared to 85% in peaceful countries. Twenty states in sub-Saharan Africa have been touched by conflict since 1999. Those countries affected by armed conflict, such as Somalia and the Democratic Republic of the Congo, are furthest from meeting the EFA goals and contain the majority of the unschooled inhabitants of sub-Saharan Africa. In the Democratic Republic of the Congo, in North Kivu, a region particularly affected by conflicts, for example, the likelihood of young people aged between 17 and 22 having had only two years of schooling was twice the national average.

Less than half the children in sub-Saharan Africa can neither read nor write: a quarter of primary-school-age children reach the fourth year without having acquired the basics and over a third do not reach the fourth year. According to the 2010 EFA Global Monitoring Report, "millions of children are leaving school without having acquired basic skills. In some countries in sub-Saharan Africa, young adults with five years of education had a 40% probability of being illiterate". The teacher training systems are generally not able to meet the quantitative and qualitative needs of training. In Chad, for example, only 35.5% of teachers are certified to teach.

In addition to the lack of qualified teachers, there is also the problem of extra-large classes in public schools. In Nigeria, there are schools with a teacher to pupil ratio of 80:1. This makes it difficult for personalized instruction. There is also a lack of culturally relevant teaching-learning aids for teachers and students.

School-based feeding programs are sometimes used to ease access to education, especially in poor communities. Altogether, at least 60.1 million children in Africa benefit from school meal programs, reaching about 21% of school-age children on the continent. School feeding coverage is greatest in southern Africa and least in central Africa. From 2017 to 2020, these school meal programs expanded in a majority of African countries.

Educational technology 

Educational technology in sub-Saharan Africa refers to the promotion, development and use of information and communication technologies (ICT), m-learning, media, and other technological tools to improve aspects of education in sub-Saharan Africa. Since the 1960s, various information and communication technologies have aroused strong interest in sub-Saharan Africa as a way of increasing access to education, and enhancing its quality and fairness.

The development of individual computer technology has proved a major turning point in the implementation of projects dependent on technology use, and calls for the acquisition of computer skills first by teachers and then by pupils. Between 1990 and 2000, multiple actions were started in order to turn technologies into a lever for improving education in sub-Saharan Africa. Many initiatives focused on equipping schools with computer hardware. A number of NGOs contributed, on varying scales, to bringing computer hardware into Africa, such as groups like Computer Aid International, Digital Links, SchoolNet Africa and World Computer Exchange. Sometimes with backing from cooperation agencies or development agencies like USAID, the African Bank or the French Ministry of Foreign Affairs, these individual initiatives grew without adequate coordination. States found it difficult to define their national strategies with regard to ICT in Education.

The American One Laptop per Child (OLPC) project, launched in several African countries in 2005, aimed to equip schools with laptop computers at low cost. While the average price of an inexpensive personal computer was between US$200 and US$500, OLPC offered its ultraportable XO-1 computer at the price of US$100. This technological breakthrough marked an important step in potential access to ICT. OLPC became an institutional system: the programme was "bought" by governments, which then took responsibility for distribution to the schools. The underlying logic of the initiative was one of centralization, thus enabling the largescale distribution of the equipment. Almost 2 million teachers and pupils are now involved in the programme worldwide (http://one.laptop.org/) and more than 2.4 million computers have been delivered. Following on from OLPC, the Intel group launched Classmate PC, a similar programme also intended for pupils in developing countries. Though it has a smaller presence in sub-Saharan Africa than the OLPC project, Classmate PC has enabled laptop computers to be delivered to primary schools in the Seychelles and Kenya, particularly in rural areas. Also in Kenya, the CFSK (Computer for School in Kenya) project was started in 2002 with the aim of distributing computers to almost 9,000 schools.

The cross-fertilization of teaching models and tools has now broadened the potential of ICT within the educational framework. Certain technologies, perceived as outdated compared to more innovative technology, nonetheless remain very much embedded in local practice. Today they are undergoing a partial revival, thanks to the combination of different media that can be used in any single project. Despite its limited uses in teaching, radio is a medium that still has considerable reach in terms of its audience. Cheaper than a computer, it also has a cost-benefit ratio that makes it attractive to many project planners. Launched in 2008, the BBC Janala programme, offering English courses in a combination of different media, including lessons of a few minutes via mobile phone, received more than 85,000 calls per day in the weeks following the launch of the service. In 15 months, over 10 million calls (paid, but at a reduced price compared to a normal communication) were made, by over 3 million users. Television, a feature of very many households, is witnessing a revival in its educational uses, by being combined with other media. As part of the Bridge IT programme in Tanzania, short educational videos, also available on mobile phones, are broadcast on the classroom television so that all the pupils can take part collectively. The e-Schools' Network in South Africa has also, since March 2013, been developing an educational project, the object of which is to utilize unused television frequencies. There are currently ten schools taking part in the project.

Another digital tool with multiple uses, the interactive whiteboard (IWB), is also being used in some schools in sub-Saharan Africa. At the end of the 2000s, the Education for All Network (REPTA), in partnership with the Worldwide Fund for Digital Solidarity (FSN) and, in France, the interministerial delegation for digital education in Africa (DIENA) made interactive whiteboards available to schools in Burkina Faso, Niger, Benin, Senegal and Mali, along with open content. The use of the IWB has had a positive effect on motivation, for pupils and teachers alike. However, their impact in terms of learning has been muted. This system marginalizes the direct participation of the pupils in favour of multi-media demonstrations initiated by the teacher.

The main initiatives based on the use of ICT and the Internet in education originally focused on distance learning at university level. Thus, the African Virtual University (AVU), set up by the World Bank in 1997, was originally conceived as an alternative to traditional teaching. When it became an intergovernmental agency in 2003, it was training 40,000 people, mostly on short programmes. It shifted its focus to teacher training and to integrating technology into higher education. The AVU has ten e-learning centres. The Agence universitaire de la Francophonie (AUF) has also, since 1999, set up around forty French-speaking digital campuses, more than half of them in Africa. In these infrastructures, dedicated to technology and set up within the universities, the AUF offers access to over 80 first and master's degrees entirely by distance learning, about 30 of which are awarded by African institutions and created with its support. More recently, the MOOCs (Massive Open Online Courses) phenomenon has grown up, first in the United States and then in Europe.

Recommendations for reform

 Government review and regulate school and district financial record-keeping.
 More comprehensive training of head teachers and administrators in economic administration.
 Regular government inspection of schools.
 Encourage parents to complain or fight against school fees and proactively help parents to know their rights.
 Empower and mobilize local watchdog organizations such as parent-teacher organizations and school-management committees.
 Improve teacher compensation.
 Government investment in child and youth development through appropriate education and health policies and programmes.
 Increase access to early childhood development programmes.
 Increase access to schools.
 Improve transportation infrastructure in rural areas.
 Diversifying systems of education and broadening skills taught to make education more pertinent to the demands of the economy.

There is also a push in many African countries to reform colonial education standards to emphasize the importance of indigenous languages and cultures instead of European languages and cultures. Critics of these reforms maintain that European languages should continue to be the focus of education to ensure that African students can be competitive in a European-dominated global economy.

Recommendations for higher education reform

Curriculum reform geared towards entrepreneurial skills and jobs in the private sector.
 Greater emphasis on locally-relevant diploma and certificate programs, instead of overproducing university graduates.
Adoption of a system of easily identifiable and comparable degrees.
Adoption of a system based on undergraduate and graduate degree cycles.
Promotion of student and faculty mobility.
Training and student opportunities should be accessible to students.
All educational faculty such as administrative staff, professors, and researchers should have access to services relevant to their fields of study.

See also

 Education in Tanzania
 Adult education in Africa
 History of female education in Africa
 Computers for African Schools
 Education in Mali
 Education in Nigeria
 Education in Uganda
 Education in the Middle East and North Africa
 Education in South Africa
 Education in Kenya
 Multilingual education in Africa

References

Sources

Further reading
 Ajayi, J. F. A., Lameck, K. H. Goma and G. Ampah Johnson. The African Experience with Higher Education (Accra: Association of African Universities, 1996).
 Ashby, Eric, with Mary Anderson. Universities: British, Indian, African: A Study in the Ecology of Higher Education (London: Weidenfeld & Nicolson, 1966).
 Dilger, Hansjörg. Learning Morality, Inequalities, and Faith: Christian and Muslim Schools in Tanzania (Cambridge: Cambridge University Press & International African Institute, 2022).  
 Fafunwa, A. Babs. History of Education in Nigeria (London: Allen & Unwin, 1974).
 Gamble, Harry. Contesting French West Africa: Battles over Schools and the Colonial Order, 1900-1950 (U of Nebraska Press, 2017).  378 pp. online review
 Harper, Jim C. Western-educated elites in Kenya, 1900-1963: the African American factor (Routledge, 2005).
 Kithinji, Michael Mwenda. "An imperial enterprise: The making and breaking of the University of East Africa, 1949–1969." Canadian Journal of African Studies/La Revue canadienne des études africaines 46.2 (2012): 195–214.
 Livsey, Timothy. "Imagining an Imperial Modernity: Universities and the West African Roots of Colonial Development." Journal of Imperial and Commonwealth History 44#6 (2016): 952–975.
 Lulat, Y. G. M. "The development of higher education in Africa: A historical survey." in Damtew Teferra and Philip G. Altbach, eds. African higher education: An international reference handbook (2003): 15–31.
 Mills, David. "Life on the hill: students and the social history of Makerere." Africa 76.2 (2006): 247–266.
 Njagi, Mwangi Daniel. Imperial Education and the Crisis of Political Leadership in Postcolonial Kenya ( Dissertation, State University of New York at Stony Brook, 2011) online.
 Nwauwa, Apollos O. Imperialism, Academe and Nationalism: Britain and University Education for Africans, 1860–1960 (London: Frank Cass, 1997).
 Ogunlade, Festus O. "Education and Politics in Colonial Nigeria: The Case of King's College, Lagos (1906–1911)." Journal of the Historical Society of Nigeria 7#2 (1974): 325–345.
 Okafor, N. The Development of Universities in Nigeria (London: Longman, 1971).
 Teferra, Damtew and Philip G. Altbach, eds. African higher education: An international reference handbook (2003)
 Whitehead, Clive. "The 'Two-way Pull' and the Establishment of University Education in British West Africa." History of Education 16#2 (1987): 119–133.

External links
AET Africa | Portal for Agricultural Education and Training in Africa  - Provides information on agricultural education in Africa
PROTA  - Provides information on the approximately 7,000 useful plants of Tropical Africa and to provide wide access to the information through Webdatabases, Books, CD-Rom's and Special Products.

Portal for education in Africa
Southern and Eastern Africa Consortium for Monitoring Educational Quality (SACMEQ)
The African Children's Educational Trust
African Sage Philosophy entry discussing philosophic sagacity by Gail M. Presbey
Africa Education Website